Grandisonia is a genus of amphibian in the family Grandisoniidae.

Species 

The genus contains three species:

References 

 
Amphibian genera
Taxa named by Edward Harrison Taylor
Taxonomy articles created by Polbot